Environmental virtue ethics (EVE) is, as the name suggests, a way of approaching environmental ethics through the lens of virtue ethics. It is paradoxically both a very new and a relatively old or established approach. It is old or established because, as Louke Van Wensveen points out, almost all environmental literature employs virtue language. It is new because it is only recently that this tendency to use virtue-laden language has been taken up explicitly and addressed through the lens of philosophical virtue ethics.

Early interest in applying virtue theory to environmental problems can be found in disparate articles in academic and environmental journals, such as Thomas Hill's "Ideals of Human Excellence and Preserving Natural Environments." The first major analysis of this approach is Louke Van Wensveen’s influential book Dirty Virtues: The Emergence of Ecological Virtue Ethics.

Environmental virtue ethicists take inspiration from a variety of schools of virtue ethics and from diverse backgrounds in environmental ethics. Nevertheless, there are three general approaches to identifying virtues and vices within EVE. First, the "virtue theory approach," which attempts to build an environmental virtue ethics from the ground up. Second, the "environmental exemplar approach," which looks to people who are generally considered to be environmentally virtuous as models. And, finally, the "extensionist approach," which takes traditional virtues and extends them to operate in an environmentally meaningful way. While some authors take one of these approaches, others combine elements from two or more. 

Typical EVE topics include: the explication of specific virtues or vices; the analysis of specific exemplars who embody one or more of the virtues; the attempt to weigh in on specific environmental problems from the perspective of virtue ethics, including offering rules (“v-rules”) for conduct or making actual policy recommendations; and, of course, arguing for the theoretical foundation and legitimacy of the virtue-theory approach to environmental ethics.

List of notable environmental virtue ethicists

Philip Cafaro
Geoffrey Frasz
Eugene Hargrove
Thomas Hill
Rosalind Hursthouse
Jason Kawall
Randy Larsen
Val Plumwood
Ronald Sandler
David St. Aubin
Allen Thompson
Brian Treanor
Louke Van Wensveen
Laura Westra

References

Further reading
Cafaro, Philip. Thoreau's Living Ethics: Walden and the Pursuit of Virtue. Athens and London: University of Georgia Press, 2004.
Sandler, Ronald. Character and Environment: A Virtue-Oriented Approach to Environmental Ethics. New York: Columbia University Press, 2007.
Sandler, Ronald and Philip Cafaro. Environmental Virtue Ethics. New York: Rowman and Littlefield, 2005.
Treanor, Brian. Emplotting Virtue: A Narrative Approach to Environmental Virtue Ethics. New York: SUNY Press, 2014.
Wensveen, Louke van.  Dirty Virtues: The Emergence of Ecological Virtue Ethics. Amherst, NY: Prometheus Books, 2000.

Environmental ethics
Virtue ethics